Armi Jager, otherwise known as Adler Jager, was a German-Italian firearms manufacturer located in the small town of Loano, Italy.

Early history

The gun manufacturer was active since the early 1950s, manufacturing semi-automatic .22 rimfire sporting rifles and replica "Western" revolvers. Later it evolved to rimfire and small-caliber centerfire (.32 ACP) firearms patterned after the look of military rifles which at the time were difficult or illegal to own for civilians in Italy. Some of its best-known products were several .22 rimfire versions styled after the M16 rifle, known as the AP-74 and AP-74M; replicas of the Armalite AR-18 assault rifle, known as the AP-75; replicas of the Russian Kalashnikov AK-47 assault rifle, known as the AP-80; replicas of the British SA-80 bull-pup rifle, known as the AP-82; replicas of the Israeli Galil assault rifle, known as the AP-84; replicas of the French FA-MAS bull-pup rifle, known as the AP-85. The factory sold most of its designs under the trade name Adler. The Armi Jager production saw significant sales in Italy and exports in the United States, earning a reputation as high quality plinking rifles.

Recent history

Firearms production at Jager ended by early 1993, according to the old owner Mr. Piscetta for "lack of skilled personnel". The activity continues though as a gun store and gunsmithing shop located in the town of Basaluzzo, Alessandria province. The enterprise has since changed its name to "Nuova Jager".

Since 2009 the company has been acquired by Mr. Massimiliano Locci, who is going to move the activity of the company on the import, the transforming and wholesale of military full auto weapons. In the meanwhile, a direct new line of carbines AR-15 has been created and manufactured for civilian and military market too, for whom the company is making maintenance and assistance too. Always for military market Nuova Jager distributes San Swiss Arms products (SIG).

See also

List of Italian companies
List of German companies

References

External links
Official website

Companies based in Piedmont
Firearm manufacturers of Italy
Italian brands
Manufacturing companies established in 1949
Italian companies established in 1949